Clupeinae is a subfamily of herrings, sardines and sprats belonging to the family Clupeidae.

Notes

References 
 Whitehead PJP, Nelson GJ and Wongratana T (1988) FAO species catalogue, volume 7: Clupeoid Fishes of the World (Suborder Clupeoidei) FAO Fisheries Synopsis 125, Rome. . Download ZIP (16 MB)

 
Seafood
Commercial fish
Oily fish